Alexander John Smits  (born December 25, 1948) is an Australian-American engineer and academic who is the Eugene Higgins Professor of Mechanical and Aerospace Engineering, Emeritus, at Princeton University. He is also the director of the Gas dynamics laboratory at Princeton. Smits received his Bachelor of Science in mechanical engineering from the University of Melbourne, Australia in 1970. Subsequently he received his Ph.D. from Melbourne in 1975.

Smits is an expert in the areas of turbulence and fluid mechanics, and is also the chief editor of Efluids.com, a website designed for students and researchers to share information about fluids. He is also currently an associate editor for the Journal of Fluid Mechanics and the Journal of Turbulence. Smits is the head of the Mechanical and Aerospace Engineering Department at Princeton University.

Smits was elected a member of the National Academy of Engineering in 2011 for contributions to the measurement and understanding of turbulent flows, fluids engineering, and education. Also, he became a member of the American Academy of Arts and Sciences in 2020. He was awarded the Batchelor Prize in 2020 for his significant research contributions to fluid mechanics over the previous decade.

Smits was appointed Officer of the Order of Australia (AO) in the 2023 Australia Day Honours for "distinguished service to aerospace engineering, particularly in the field of fluid dynamics, and to tertiary education".

References in Pop Culture 
Smits was referenced in an episode of Numb3rs, in which it was stated (with regard to fluid dynamics) that "there is some amazing work done by Prandtl, Euler, and Smits."

Bibliography 
Alexander Smits, Eugene Higgins Professor of Mechanical and Aerospace Engineering, Chair

References 

1948 births
Living people
Australian mechanical engineers
Princeton University faculty
University of Melbourne alumni
Engineers from Amsterdam
Dutch emigrants to Australia
Fellows of the American Institute of Aeronautics and Astronautics
Fellows of the American Physical Society
Fellows of the American Society of Mechanical Engineers
Fellows of the American Association for the Advancement of Science
Officers of the Order of Australia